The Cavan county football team represents Cavan in men's Gaelic football and is governed by Cavan GAA, the county board of the Gaelic Athletic Association. The team competes in the Lory Meagher Cup and the National Hurling League.

Cavan's home ground is Breffni Park, Cavan. The team's manager is Ollie Bellew.

History

1908–2011
Cavan represented Ulster in the semi-final of the 1908 All-Ireland Senior Hurling Championship, but lost the delayed Ulster final to Derry. Cavan reached the Ulster final six times, but never won the competition. Cavan won the Ulster Junior Hurling Championship in 1983 and 1985, as well as Division 4 of the National Hurling League in 1983.

After an extended period of poor results, on 26 April 2011, Cavan announced that they would withdraw from Senior hurling for the foreseeable future, citing poor attendance at training and lack of numbers. This left Cavan as the only county in Ireland without a senior hurling team. In the next few years, the county board focused on developing hurling at underage level.

2017–present
After six years without fielding a team, Cavan played in the Lory Meagher Cup in 2017.
Cavan re-entered the National Hurling League in 2018, competing in Division 3B.

Cavan reached the final of the Lory Meagher Cup for the first time in 2021 after a win over Louth. The final took place in Croke Park on 31 July 2021, with Cavan facing Fermanagh. Fermanagh won the match by 3–26 to 1–17.

Current panel

Current management team
Manager: Ollie Bellew
Selector: Tomás Mannion

Managerial history

Honours

National
Lory Meagher Cup
 Runners-up (1): 2021
National Hurling League Division 4
 Winners (1): 1983

Provincial
Ulster Senior Hurling Championship
 Runners-up (6): 1908, 1926, 1927, 1928, 1935, 1936
Ulster Junior Hurling Championship
 Winners (2): 1983, 1985
 Runners-up (2): 1988, 1994

References

 
County hurling teams